Ronald Healey (30 August 1952 – 18 June 2018) was an Irish professional footballer who played as a goalkeeper. Born in England, Healey played for Cardiff City and Manchester City during his career and earned two caps for the Republic of Ireland national football team.

Club career

Healey was a goalkeeper who began his career with Manchester City. Following an apprenticeship with City, he signed professional forms for the club in October 1969 and he made his debut at 17. As he was the understudy to the English international goalkeeper Joe Corrigan, he only played 30 times for City between 1970 and 1974 before moving to Cardiff City in March 1974, making his debut in a 2–2 draw with West Bromwich Albion. On his arrival he shared the no.1 spot with Bill Irwin before eventually managing to claim the spot as his own. During the 1975–76 season he helped the club to win promotion to Division Two.

After a spell with Bangor City, he retired from the game through injury.

International career

He also played international football twice for the Republic of Ireland national football team. He kept a clean sheet on his international debut, a 0–0 draw with Poland on 24 April 1977 and made his only other appearance as a substitute for Gerry Peyton in a World Cup qualifier against England at Wembley Stadium in 1980.

Death

On 18 June 2018, Healey died after collapsing on a cycle ride.

Honours
Cardiff City

 Division Three Runners-up: 1
 1975–76
 Welsh Cup Winner: 1
 1975–76
 Welsh Cup Runner-up: 1
 1976–77

See also
 List of Republic of Ireland international footballers born outside the Republic of Ireland

References

1952 births
2018 deaths
Republic of Ireland association footballers
Republic of Ireland international footballers
Manchester City F.C. players
Coventry City F.C. players
Preston North End F.C. players
Cardiff City F.C. players
Footballers from Manchester
English Football League players
Association football goalkeepers